Maryland's Legislative District 8 is one of 47 districts in the state for the Maryland General Assembly. The district currently consists of part of Baltimore County, Maryland. The district includes the communities of Carney, Overlea, Parkville, Perry Hall, Rosedale, Rossville, Towson, and White Marsh. The District was established in 1975. The district also represented a small portion of Northeast Baltimore City, Maryland from 1995 to 2002.

The district is represented by one State Senator and three State Delegates all of which serve four year terms elected during the Maryland Gubernatorial Elections.

Demographic characteristics
As of the 2020 United States census, the district had a population of 128,063, of whom 100,573 (78.5%) were of voting age. The racial makeup of the district was 66,336 (51.8%) White, 38,866 (30.3%) African American, 419 (0.3%) Native American, 10,891 (8.5%) Asian, 25 (0.0%) Pacific Islander, 3,920 (3.1%) from some other race, and 7,584 (5.9%) from two or more races. Hispanic or Latino of any race were 7,625 (6.0%) of the population.

The district had 85,483 registered voters as of October 17, 2020, of whom 15,859 (18.6%) were registered as unaffiliated, 22,639 (26.5%) were registered as Republicans, 45,541 (53.3%) were registered as Democrats, and 889 (1.0%) were registered to other parties.

Political representation
The district is represented for the 2023–2027 legislative term in the State Senate by Katherine A. Klausmeier (D) and in the House of Delegates by Nick Allen (D), Harry Bhandari (D), and Carl W. Jackson (D).

Election history
Thomas L. Bromwell resigned from the Senate in 2002 to head the Maryland Injured Workers' Insurance Fund or IWIF, a state agency. Governor Parris Glendening appointed John R. Schneider to replace Bromwell in District 8. Schneider died only two months after his appointment, and Governor Glendening then appointed Joseph T. Ferraracci to the seat. However, Ferraracci did not run for election in 2002. Neither Schneider or Ferraracci served in the legislature during session. Katherine A. Klausmeier ran for the seat as a Democrat and won.

John W. E. Cluster Jr. was appointed as Delegate by Governor Bob Ehrlich in 2003 to replace Republican Alfred W. Redmer Jr., who was named Maryland Insurance Commissioner.

Joe Cluster was appointed by Governor Larry Hogan in 2016 to fill the vacancy of former Delegate John Cluster, his father, who resigned to serve on the Maryland Parole Commission.

Carl W. Jackson was appointed by Governor Larry Hogan in 2019 to fill the vacancy of former Delegate Eric M. Bromwell, who resigned to serve as Baltimore County Opioid Strategy Coordinator.

State Senate election results
2018 General Election for Maryland State Senate - District 8
Voters to choose one:
{|  class="wikitable"
|-
!Name
!Votes
!Percent
!Outcome
|-
|-
|Katherine A. Klausmeier
|24,332
|  51.1%
|   Won
|-
|-
|Christian Miele
|23,271
|  48.8%
|   Lost
|-
|Other Write-Ins
|45
|  0.1%
|   Lost
|}

2018 Democratic Primary Election for Maryland State Senate - District 8
Voters to choose one:
{|  class="wikitable"
|-
!Name
!Votes
!Percent
!Outcome
|-
|-
|Katherine A. Klausmeier
|8,495
|  87.7%
|   Won
|-
|-
|Max Davidson
|1,195
|  12.3%
|   Lost
|}

2018 Republican Primary Election for Maryland State Senate - District 8
Voters to choose one:
{|  class="wikitable"
|-
!Name
!Votes
!Percent
!Outcome
|-
|-
|Christian Miele
|5,486
|  100.0%
|   Won
|}

2014 General Election for Maryland State Senate - District 8
Voters to choose one:
{|  class="wikitable"
|-
!Name
!Votes
!Percent
!Outcome
|-
|-
|Katherine A. Klausmeier, Dem.
|23,638
|  61.2%
|   Won
|-
|-
|Erik Lofstad, Rep.
|14,938
|  38.7%
|   Lost
|-
|Other Write-Ins
|37
|  0.1%
|   Lost
|}

2014 Democratic Primary Election for Maryland State Senate - District 8
Voters to choose one:
{|  class="wikitable"
|-
!Name
!Votes
!Percent
!Outcome
|-
|-
|Katherine A. Klausmeier
|8,016
|  81.7%
|   Won
|-
|-
|John Bishop
|1,800
|  18.3%
|   Lost
|}

2014 Republican Primary Election for Maryland State Senate - District 8
Voters to choose one:
{|  class="wikitable"
|-
!Name
!Votes
!Percent
!Outcome
|-
|-
|Erik Lofstad
|3,565
|  100.0%
|   Won
|}

2010 General Election for Maryland State Senate - District 8
Voters to choose one:
{|  class="wikitable"
|-
!Name
!Votes
!Percent
!Outcome
|-
|-
|Katherine A. Klausmeier, Dem.
|25,155
|  59.7%
|   Won
|-
|-
|Dee Hodges, Rep.
|16,968
|  40.2%
|   Lost
|-
|Other Write-Ins
|41
|  0.1%
|   Lost
|}

2010 Democratic Primary Election for Maryland State Senate - District 8
Voters to choose one:
{|  class="wikitable"
|-
!Name
!Votes
!Percent
!Outcome
|-
|-
|Katherine A. Klausmeier
|9,273
|  100.0%
|   Won
|}

2010 Republican Primary Election for Maryland State Senate - District 8
Voters to choose one:
{|  class="wikitable"
|-
!Name
!Votes
!Percent
!Outcome
|-
|-
|Dee Hodges
|4,155
|  71.8%
|   Won
|-
|-
|Benjamin Lawless
|1,633
|  28.2%
|   Lost
|}

2006 General Election for State Senate - District 8
Voters to choose one:
{|  class="wikitable"
|-
!Name
!Votes
!Percent
!Outcome
|-
|-
|Katherine A. Klausmeier, Dem.
|24,299
|  58.2%
|   Won
|-
|-
|Craig Borne, Rep.
|17,401
|  41.7%
|   Lost
|-
|Other Write-Ins
|37
|  0.1%
|   Lost
|}

2006 Democratic Primary Election for Maryland State Senate - District 8
Voters to choose one:
{|  class="wikitable"
|-
!Name
!Votes
!Percent
!Outcome
|-
|-
|Katherine A. Klausmeier
|10,501
|  100.0%
|   Won
|}

2006 Republican Primary Election for Maryland State Senate - District 8
Voters to choose one:
{|  class="wikitable"
|-
!Name
!Votes
!Percent
!Outcome
|-
|-
|Craig Borne
|3,083
|  68.1%
|   Won
|-
|-
|Cal Clemons
|1,444
|  31.9%
|   Lost
|}

2002 General Election for Maryland State Senate - District 8
Voters to choose one:
{|  class="wikitable"
|-
!Name
!Votes
!Percent
!Outcome
|-
|-
|Katherine A. Klausmeier, Dem.
|24,590
|  58.5%
|   Won
|-
|-
|John W. E. Cluster Jr., Rep.
|17,426
|  41.4%
|   Lost
|-
|Other Write-Ins
|55
|  0.1%
|   Lost
|}

2002 Democratic Primary Election for Maryland House of Delegates - District 8
Voters to choose one:
{|  class="wikitable"
|-
!Name
!Votes
!Percent
!Outcome
|-
|-
|Katherine A. Klausmeier
|10,463
|  85.2%
|   Won
|-
|-
|Raymond C. Shiflet
|1,815
|  14.8%
|   Lost
|}

2002 Republican Primary for Maryland State Senate - District 8
Voters to choose one:
{|  class="wikitable"
|-
!Name
!Votes
!Percent
!Outcome
|-
|-
|John W. E. Cluster Jr.
|5,209
|  100.0%
|   Won
|}

1998 General Election for Maryland State Senate - District 8
Voters to choose one:
{|  class="wikitable"
|-
!Name
!Votes
!Percent
!Outcome
|-
|-
|Thomas L. Bromwell, Dem.
|22,837
|  68%
|   Won
|-
|-
|William Rush, Rep.
|10,954
|  32%
|   Lost
|}

1998 Democratic Primary Election for Maryland State Senate - District 8
Voters to choose one:
{|  class="wikitable"
|-
!Name
!Votes
!Percent
!Outcome
|-
|-
|Thomas L. Bromwell
|7,585
|  100%
|   Won
|}

1998 Republican Primary Election for Maryland State Senate - District 8
Voters to choose one:
{|  class="wikitable"
|-
!Name
!Votes
!Percent
!Outcome
|-
|-
|William Rush
|3,483
|  100%
|   Won
|}

House of Delegates election results
2018 General Election for Maryland House of Delegates - District 8
Voters to choose up to three:
{|  class="wikitable"
|-
!Name
!Votes
!Percent
!Outcome
|-
|-
|Eric M. Bromwell
|22,485
|  18.0%
|   Won
|-
|-
|Harry Bhandari
|22,094
|  17.7%
|   Won
|-
|-
|Joseph C. Boteler
|20,802
|  16.7%
|   Won
|-
|-
|Carl W. Jackson
|20,232
|  16.2%
|   Lost
|-
|-
|Joe Cluster
|20,084
|  16.1%
|   Lost
|-
|-
|Joe Norman
|18,898
|  15.2%
|   Lost
|-
|Other Write-Ins
|99
|  0.1%
|   Lost
|}

2018 Democratic Primary Election for Maryland House of Delegates - District 8
Voters to choose up to three:
{|  class="wikitable"
|-
!Name
!Votes
!Percent
!Outcome
|-
|-
|Eric M. Bromwell
|6,595
|  31.2%
|   Won
|-
|-
|Harry Bhandari
|5,941
|  28.1%
|   Won
|-
|-
|Carl W. Jackson
|5,246
|  24.8%
|   Won
|-
|-
|Joe Werner
|3,335
|  15.8
|   Lost
|}

2018 Republican Primary Election for Maryland House of Delegates - District 8
Voters to choose up to three:
{|  class="wikitable"
|-
!Name
!Votes
!Percent
!Outcome
|-
|-
|Joe Cluster
|3,558
|  25.1%
|   Won
|-
|-
|Joseph C. Boteler
|3,008
|  21.2%
|   Won
|-
|-
|Joe Norman
|2,609
|  18.4%
|   Won
|-
|-
|Norma Secoura
|1,786
|  12.6%
|   Lost
|-
|-
|Kevin Leary
|1,589
|  11.2%
|   Lost
|-
|-
|Ben Boehl
|1,244
|  8.8%
|   Lost
|-
|-
|Jared Wineberg
|401
|  2.8
|   Lost
|}

2014 General Election for Maryland House of Delegates - District 8
Voters to choose up to three:
{|  class="wikitable"
!Name
!Votes
!Percent
!Outcome
|-
|-
|Christian Miele, Rep
|20,164
|  19.4%
|   Won
|-
|-
|John W. E. Cluster Jr., Rep.
|19,938
|  19.2%
|   Won
|-
|-
|Eric M. Bromwell, Dem.
|17,361
|  16.7%
|   Won
|-
|-
|Bill Paulshock, Dem.
|15,899
|  15.3%
|   Lost
|-
|-
|Norma Secoura, Rep.
|15,660
|  15.1%
|   Lost
|-
|-
|Renee Smith, Dem.
|14,704
|  14.2%
|   Lost
|-
|Other Write-Ins
|87
|  0.1%
|   Lost
|}

2014 Democratic Primary Election for Maryland House of Delegates - District 8
Voters to choose up to three:
{|  class="wikitable"
|-
!Name
!Votes
!Percent
!Outcome
|-
|-
|Eric M. Bromwell
|5,601
|  22.8%
|   Won
|-
|-
|Renee Smith 
|4,632
|  18.9%
|   Won
|-
|-
|Bill Paulshock
|4,512
|  18.4%
|   Won
|-
|-
|Harry "H.B." Bhandari
|3,828
|  15.6%
|   Lost
|-
|-
|Debbie Schillinger
|3,124
|  12.7%
|   Lost
|-
|-
|Steve Verch
|1,752
|  7.1%
|   Lost
|-
|-
|Kyle Arndreas Williams
|1,114
|  4.5%
|   Lost
|}

2014 Republican Primary Election for Maryland House of Delegates - District 8
Voters to choose up to three:
{|  class="wikitable"
|-
!Name
!Votes
!Percent
!Outcome
|-
|-
|John W. E. Cluster Jr.
|3,586
|  35.6%
|   Won
|-
|-
|Christian Miele
|3,297
|  32.7%
|   Won
|-
|-
|Norma Secoura
|3,198
|  31.7%
|   Won
|}

2010 General Election for Maryland House of Delegates – District 8
Voters to choose up to three:
{| class="wikitable"
|-
!Name
!Votes
!Percent
!Outcome
|-
|-
|Joseph C. Boteler III, Rep.
|21,688
|  19.4%
|   Won
|-
|-
|John W. E. Cluster Jr. Rep.
|19,462
|  17.41%
|   Won
|-
|-
|Eric M. Bromwell, Dem.
|19,379
|  17.33%
|   Won
|-
|-
|Ruth Baisden, Dem.
|18,640
|  16.67%
|   Lost
|-
|-
|Norma Secoura, Rep.
|16,458
|  14.72%
|   Lost
|-
|-
|Cal Bowman, Dem.
|16,101
|  14.4%
|   Lost
|-
|Other Write-Ins
|80
|  0.1%
|   Lost
|-
|}

2010 Democratic Primary Election for Maryland House of Delegates - District 8
Voters to choose up to three:
{|  class="wikitable"
|-
!Name
!Votes
!Percent
!Outcome
|-
|-
|Eric M. Bromwell
|8,031
|  35.0%
|   Won
|-
|-
|Ruth Baisden
|7,772
|  33.9%
|   Won
|-
|-
|Cal Bowman
|7,124
|  31.1%
|   Won
|}

2010 Republican Primary Election for Maryland House of Delegates - District 8
Voters to choose up to three:
{|  class="wikitable"
|-
!Name
!Votes
!Percent
!Outcome
|-
|-
|Joseph C. Boteler
|5,033
|  33.4%
|   Won
|-
|-
|John W. E. Cluster Jr.
|4,453
|  29.6%
|   Won
|-
|-
|Norma M. Secoura
|2,870
|  19.1%
|   Won
|-
|-
|Rani Merryman
|2,694
|  17.9%
|   Lost
|}

2006 General Election for Maryland House of Delegates – District 8
Voters to choose up to three:
{| class="wikitable"
|-
!Name
!Votes
!Percent
!Outcome
|-
|-
|Eric M. Bromwell, Dem.
|20,116
|  17.9%
|   Won
|-
|-
|Joseph C. Boteler III, Rep.
|19,586
|  17.4%
|   Won
|-
|-
|Todd Schuler, Dem.
|18,356
|  16.3%
|   Won
|-
|-
|Ruth Baisden, Dem.
|18,261
|  16.2%
|   Lost
|-
|-
|Melissa Redmer Mullahey, Rep.
|18,160
|  16.1%
|   Lost
|-
|-
|John W. E. Cluster Jr. Rep.
|18,057
|  16.0%
|   Lost
|-
|Other Write-Ins
|74
|  0.1%
|   Lost
|-
|}

2006 Democratic Primary Election for Maryland House of Delegates - District 8
Voters to choose three:
{|  class="wikitable"
|-
!Name
!Votes
!Precinct
!Outcome
|-
|-
|Eric M. Bromwell
|7,019
|  24.9%
|   Won
|-
|-
|Todd Schuler
|6,428
|  22.8%
|   Won
|-
|-
|Ruth Baisden
|6,141
|  21.8%
|   Won
|-
|-
|Alec Frick
|3,514
|  12.5%
|   Lost
|-
|-
|Peter Definbaugh
|2,743
|  9.7%
|   Lost
|-
|-
|Andrea Lynn Koshko
|2,321
|  8.2%
|   Lost
|}

2006 Republican Primary Election for Maryland House of Delegates - District 8
Voters to choose up to three:
{| class="wikitable"
|-
!Name
!Votes
!Percent
!Outcome
|-
|-
|Joseph C. Boteler
|3,702
|  31.6%
|   Won
|-
|-
|John W. E. Cluster Jr.
|3,448
|  29.4%
|   Won
|-
|-
|Melissa Redmer Mullahey
|3,298
|  28.1%
|   Won
|-
|-
|Anthony R. Davis
|1,281
|  10.9%
|   Lost
|}

2002 General Election for Maryland House of Delegates – District 8
Voters to choose up to three:
{| class="wikitable"
|-
!Name
!Votes
!Percent
!Outcome
|-
|-
|Alfred W. Redmer Jr., Rep.
|22,884
|  19.61%
|   Won
|-
|-
|Eric M. Bromwell, Dem.
|20,314
|  17.41%
|   Won
|-
|-
|Joseph C. Boteler III, Rep.
|19,826
|  16.99%
|   Won
|-
|-
|Mike Rupp, Rep.
|18,755
|  16.07%
|   Lost
|-
|-
|Tim Caslin, Dem.
|18,553
|  15.90%
|   Lost
|-
|-
|Todd Schuler, Dem.
|16,277
|  13.95%
|   Lost
|-
|Other Write-Ins
|86
|  0.07%
|   Lost
|-
|}

2002 Democratic Primary Election for Maryland House of Delegates - District 8
Voters to choose up to three:
{|  class="wikitable"
|-
!Name
!Votes
!Percent
!Outcome
|-
|-
|Eric M. Bromwell
|8,222
|  26.0%
|   Won
|-
|-
|Tim Caslin
|6,048
|  19.1%
|   Won
|-
|-
|Todd Schuler
|5,439
|  17.2%
|   Won
|-
|-
|Ruth Baisden
|5,057
|  16.0%
|   Lost
|-
|-
|Andy Peet
|2,904
|  9.2%
|   Lost
|-
|-
|Joseph Michael Ruscito Jr.
|2,816
|  8.9%
|   Lost
|-
|-
|Walter Thomas Kuebler
|1,166
|  3.7%
|   Lost
|}

2002 Republican Primary Election for Maryland House of Delegates - District 8
Voters to choose up to three:
{|  class="wikitable"
|-
!Name
!Votes
!Percent
!Outcome
|-
|-
|Alfred W. Redmer Jr.
|4,521
|  29.0%
|   Won
|-
|-
|Mike Rupp
|3,506
|  22.5%
|   Won
|-
|-
|Joseph C. Boteler
|2,982
|  19.1%
|   Won
|-
|-
|M. Norma Lane
|2,347
|  15.0%
|   Lost
|-
|-
|Mark Joseph Austra-Jaskulski
|2,242
|  14.4%
|   Lost
|}

1998 General Election for Maryland House of Delegates – District 8
Voters to choose up to three:
{| class="wikitable"
|-
!Name
!Votes
!Percent
!Outcome
|-
|-
|Katherine Klausmeier, Dem.
|19,835
|  21%
|   Won
|-
|-
|Alfred W. Redmer Jr., Rep
|17,846
|  19%
|   Won
|-
|-
|James F. Ports Jr., Rep.
|17,756
|  19%
|   Won
|-
|-
|J. Joseph Curran III, Dem.
|17,583
|  19%
|   Lost
|-
|-
|Joseph C. Boteler III, Rep.
|11,306
|  12%
|   Lost
|-
|-
|Taras Andrew Vizzi, Dem.
|9,927
|  11%
|   Lost
|-
|}

1998 Democratic Primary Election for Maryland House of Delegates - District 8
Voters to choose three:
{|  class="wikitable"
|-
!Name
!Votes
!Percent
!Outcome
|-
|-
|Katherine A. Klausmeier
|6,815
|  35%
|   Won
|-
|-
|J. Joseph Curran III
|6,605
|  34%
|   Won
|-
|-
|Taras Andrew Vizzi
|2,411
|  12%
|   Won
|-
|-
|David A. Lessner
|2,110
|  11%
|   Lost
|-
|-
|Walter Bernard Burrell Sr.
|1,495
|  8%
|   Lost
|}

1998 Republican Primary Election for Maryland House of Delegates - District 8
Voters to choose up to three:
{|  class="wikitable"
|-
!Name
!Votes
!Percent
!Outcome
|-
|-
|Alfred W. Redmer, Jr.
|3,553
|  32%
|   Won
|-
|-
|James F. Ports, Jr.
|3,344
|  30%
|   Won
|-
|-
|Joseph C. Boteler
|2,295
|  21%
|   Won
|-
|-
|William Downs
|1,070
|  10%
|   Lost
|-
|-
|D. Robert Date
|720
|  7%
|   Lost
|}

1994 General Election for Maryland House of Delegates – District 8
Voters to choose up to three:
{| class="wikitable"
|-
!Name
!Votes
!Percent
!Outcome
|-
|-
|Katherine Klausmeier, Dem.
|17,496
|  20%
|   Won
|-
|-
|Alfred W. Redmer Jr., Rep.
|14,876
|  18%
|   Won
|-
|-
|James F. Ports Jr., Rep.
|15,244
|  17%
|   Won
|-
|-
|Calvin Clemons, Rep.
|13,996
|  16%
|   Lost
|-
|-
|Daniel E. McKew, Dem.
|12,931
|  15%
|   Lost
|-
|-
|John G. Disney, Dem.
|11,886
|  14%
|   Lost
|-
|}

1994 Democratic Primary Election for Maryland House of Delegates - District 8
Voters to choose up to three:
{|  class="wikitable"
|-
!Name
!Votes
!Percent
!Outcome
|-
|-
|Katherine A. Klausmeier
|8,213
|  32%
|   Won
|-
|-
|Daniel E. McKew
|6,419
|  25%
|   Won
|-
|-
|John G. Disney
|4,747
|  19%
|   Won
|-
|-
|David A. Lessner
|3,190
|  13%
|   Lost
|-
|-
|Charles Patrick Kazlo
|2,854
|  11%
|   Lost
|}

1994 Republican Primary for Maryland House of Delegates - District 8
Voters to choose up to three:
{|  class="wikitable"
|-
!Name
!Votes
!Percent
!Outcome
|-
|-
|Alfred W. Redmer, Jr.
|3,407
|  28%
|   Won
|-
|-
|James F. Ports, Jr.
|3,372
|  28%
|   Won
|-
|-
|Calvin Clemons
|2,675
|  22%
|   Won
|-
|-
|Joseph C. Boteler
|1,556
|  13%
|   Lost
|-
|-
|D. Sharon Morris
|1,103
|  9%
|   Lost
|}

1990 General Election for Maryland House of Delegates – District 8
Voters to choose up to three:
{| class="wikitable"
|-
!Name
!Votes
!Percent
!Outcome
|-
|-
|Alfred W. Redmer Jr., Rep.
|15,354
|  18%
|   Won
|-
|-
|Joseph Bartenfelder, Dem.
|14,876
|  18%
|   Won
|-
|-
|James F. Ports Jr., Rep.
|14,266
|  17%
|   Won
|-
|-
|Kenneth G. Hirsch, Rep.
|14,129
|  17%
|   Lost
|-
|-
|Donna M. Felling, Dem.
|13,006
|  15%
|   Lost
|-
|-
|William J. Burgess, Dem.
|12,680
|  15%
|   Lost
|-
|-
|John Michael Fleig
|20
|  0%
|   Lost
|-
|}

1990 Democratic Primary Election for the Maryland House of Delegates - District 8
Voters to choose up to three:
{|  class="wikitable"
|-
!Name
!Votes
!Percent
!Outcome
|-
|-
|Joseph Bartenfelder
|7,005
|  28%
|   Won
|-
|-
|William Burgess
|6,317
|  25%
|   Won
|-
|-
|Donna M. Felling
|6,147
|  25%
|   Won
|-
|-
|Daniel E. McKew
|5,318
|  21%
|   Lost
|}

1990 Republican Primary Election for Maryland House of Delegates - District 8
Voters to choose up to three:
{|  class="wikitable"
!Name
!Votes
!Percent
!Outcome
|-
|-
|Alfred W. Redmer Jr.
|1,857
|  30%
|   Won
|-
|-
|Kenneth G. Hirsch
|1,778
|  28%
|   Won
|-
|-
|James F. Ports, Jr.
|1,662
|  27%
|   Won
|-
|-
|John Michael Fleig
|942
|  15%
|   Lost
|}

1986 General Election for Maryland House of Delegates – District 8
Voters to choose three:
{| class="wikitable"
|-
!Name
!Votes
!Percent
!Outcome
|-
|-
|Joseph Bartenfelder, Dem.
|18,245
|  23%
|   Won
|-
|-
|Donna M. Felling, Dem.
|16,443
|  21%
|   Won
|-
|-
|William J. Burgess, Dem.
|16,049
|  20%
|   Won
|-
|-
|Scott A. Sewell, Rep.
|11,610
|  15%
|   Lost
|-
|-
|Alfred W. Redmer Jr., Rep.
|10,841
|  14%
|   Lost
|-
|-
|Howard C. Harclerode, Rep.
|5,782
|  7%
|   Lost
|-
|}

1986 Democratic Primary Election for Maryland House of Delegates - District 8
Voters to choose up to three:
{|  class="wikitable"
|-
!Name
!Votes
!Percent
!Outcome
|-
|-
|Joseph Bartenfelder
|10,695
|  29%
|   Won
|-
|-
|William J. Burgess
|9,134
|  24%
|   Won
|-
|-
|Donna M. Felling
|8,096
|  22%
|   Won
|-
|-
|Dale Anderson
|7,593
|  20%
|   Lost
|-
|-
|Kenneth Skidmore
|1,898
|  5%
|   Lost
|}

1986 Republican Primary Election for Maryland House of Delegates - District 8
Voters to choose up to three:
{|  class="wikitable"
|-
!Name
!Votes
!Percent
!Outcome
|-
|-
|Scott A. Sewell
|1,925
|  33%
|   Won
|-
|-
|Alfred W. Redmer, Jr.
|1,661
|  29%
|   Won
|-
|-
|Howard C. Haclerode
|948
|  16%
|   Won
|-
|-
|William A. Howard IV
|708
|  12%
|   Lost
|-
|-
|J. Franklin Ports
|508
|  9%
|   Lost
|}

References

Baltimore County, Maryland
08
08